Temperance Hall may refer to:

 A building used for Temperance movement-related activities

United States

 Temperance Hall (Dedham, Massachusetts), a building established in 1845
 Cokato Temperance Hall, an 1896 clubhouse built in Cokato Township, Minnesota
 Temperance Hall (1851), part of the Hertford Historic District, North Carolina
 Mount Hebron Temperance Hall, an 1862 chapter house in West Columbia, Lexington County, South Carolina
 Temperance Hall, Tennessee, an unincorporated community
 Old Temperance Hall (c. 1849), part of the Union Historic District, West Virginia

Other places
 Orange and Temperance Hall, in Tobermore, County Londonderry, Northern Ireland
 Toronto Temperance Hall, in Toronto, Ontario, Canada; see 
 Avalon Theatre, Hobart, (formerly Temperance Hall), in Hobart, Tasmania, Australia

See also
 Temperance (disambiguation)
 Temperance Billiard Hall (disambiguation)